NTG may refer to:

A common abbreviation for Northern Territory Government
Nitroglycerin, a chemical used in demolition as dynamite and in medicine as a vasodilator
Methylnitronitrosoguanidine, a carcinogen and a mutagen
Nils Granlund, the Broadway showman and Loew's Theater publicist Nils Thor Granlund
Next Time Gadget, an American electronic musician
IATA code for Nantong Xingdong Airport, Jiangsu, China